Los Peñasquitos Canyon Preserve is an urban park in San Diego, California. The preserve is jointly owned and administered by the City of San Diego and the County of San Diego. 

Los Peñasquitos is also home to the historic Rancho Santa Maria de Los Peñasquitos, an adobe home built in the early 1820s. Operated by the County of San Diego, the home has been restored and tours are available for the public.

Natural history

More than 500 plant species, more than 175 types of birds, and a great variety of reptiles, amphibians and mammals make up the rich bio-diversity of the park. Many of these species are rare or endangered. Mammals commonly spotted in the preserve include mule deer, bobcats, coyotes, and rabbits. A rare mountain lion attack occurred in May 2019. 

The geology of the Preserve area has been described in a geology book by John Northrup in conjunction with the University of California & published by Windsor Associates. Nearby is the Torrey Pines State Reserve, where one of only two extant stands of the endangered Torrey Pine is found.

References

Further reading
 C.Michael Hogan (2008) Torrey Pine: Pinus torreyana, Globaltwitcher, ed. Nicklas Stromberg 
 John Northrop. 1988. Geology of Los Peñasquitos Canyon, 40 pages

External links

 Los Peñasquitos Canyon Preserve - City of San Diego website
 Rancho de los Peñasquitos
 Map of Los Peñasquitos Canyon Preserve
 

Parks in San Diego
Municipal parks in California
Regional parks in California
Nature reserves in California
Urban public parks